Francesco Franzese (born 8 September 1981 in Nola) is a former Italian football goalkeeper. He is currently the goalkeeping coach for Serie C side Arezzo.

External links
Profile at aic.football.it 

1981 births
Living people
Italian footballers
Novara F.C. players
S.S. Juve Stabia players
Hellas Verona F.C. players
Association football goalkeepers